Edupower Oy Ab is an international energy management and consultancy company headquartered in Vaasa, Finland with overseas operations in Shanghai, China. It was founded on 20 August 2012 by Kim Westerlund.

The company focuses on the energy industry and lean manufacturing, particularly power plant and energy project consulting, as well as industry, municipal and educational operational development. It also provides continuing education services through its Edupower Nordic Institute (ENI) divisions.

Divisions

Energy Management 
EduPower's Energy Management division specialises in smart energy use and the implementation of sustainable energy. The division's primary activities consists of assessments of power plant project feasibility and profitability and support of their implementation and capital investments.

Edupower has close connections to the Vaasa Energy Institute (VEI), an organization founded by the Vaasa University of Applied Sciences, the Novia University of Applied Sciences, and the University of Vaasa. VEI was formed to promote cooperation between local energy industry experts and a group of higher education providers, the Vaasa Consortium of Higher Education.

Edupower Nordic Institute 
Edupower's educational initiatives, including continuing education courses, are provided under the Edupower Nordic Institute (ENI) brand.

References

External links 
 

Companies based in Vaasa
Energy companies of Finland
Business services companies established in 2012
Education companies of Europe
Education companies established in 2012
Finnish companies established in 2012
Service companies of Finland